"Another Life" is a song by Dutch DJ and record producer Afrojack and French DJ and record producer David Guetta, featuring American singer-songwriter Ester Dean. It was released on 28 April 2017 via Afrojack's label Wall Recordings.

Background
The song was first teased by Afrojack on 23 April 2017 via Twitter, in which the single's release date and cover art was revealed.

Music video
The music video was released alongside the single and directed by Sanghon Kim.

Track listing

Personnel
Adapted from Tidal.

 Afrojack – composition, production
 David Guetta – production
 Ester Dean – composition
 Faisal Ben Said – composition
 Jay Karama – drum programming
 Cassian Irvine – mastering engineering, mixing
 Elio Debets – mixing
 Adam Korbesmeyer – recording engineering

Charts

Weekly charts

Year-end charts

Release history

References

Afrojack songs
David Guetta songs
Songs written by Ester Dean
2017 songs
2017 singles
Songs written by Afrojack
Future bass songs
Animated music videos
Song recordings produced by David Guetta